Drosera bicolor is an erect perennial tuberous species in the genus Drosera that is endemic to Western Australia. Its white flowers that have a red spot near the petal base emerge from September to October. D. bicolor grows in deep silica sand on heathland along the upper Phillips River and south-east of Lake King.

Drosera bicolor was first described by Allen Lowrie and Sherwin Carlquist in 1992. Lowrie notes in his book Carnivorous Plants of Australia that this species is distinct from other related species, including D. peltata and D. salina, by its bicoloured flowers and the arrangement of its petioles and number of flowers. Some, however, consider this species to simply be a variety or synonymous with D. peltata, though this opinion has not been formally published.

See also 
List of Drosera species

References 

 Gibson, R. 2012. Drosera bicolor Lowrie & Carlquist. Carnivorous Plant Newsletter 41(4): 128–131.

External links 

Carnivorous plants of Australia
Caryophyllales of Australia
Eudicots of Western Australia
Plants described in 1992
bicolor